The 2014-15 Under-21 Premier League Cup (known as the Barclays Under-21 Premier League Cup for sponsorship reasons) was the second edition of the U21 Premier League Cup.

Participants 
There were six fewer participants than the previous season. The eight clubs that chose not to re-enter were Arsenal, Chelsea, Crystal Palace, Coventry City, Notts County, Bristol Rovers, Exeter City and Torquay United. The two clubs entering the competition for the first time were Charlton Athletic and Ipswich Town.

Category 1

Category 2

Category 3

Matches

First qualifying round
This round commences the week beginning 15 September 2014. The round was contested by 10 of the 11 clubs with Category 3 rated academies, with another, Doncaster Rovers, receiving a bye to the Second Qualifying Round.

Northern Section

Southern Section

† – After extra time

Second qualifying round
This round commences the week beginning 6 October 2014. The round was contested by Doncaster Rovers, who received a bye to this round, the five First Qualifying Round winners, and 20 of the 22 clubs with Category 2 rated academies - the other two, Crewe Alexandra and Queens Park Rangers, received a bye to the Round of 32.

Northern Section

Southern Section

† – After extra time

Round of 32
This round begins the week beginning 24 November 2014. The nineteen Category 1 sides were joined in this round by the twelve teams progressing from the Second Qualifying round. Blackburn Rovers drew a bye to the Round of 16.

Northern Section

Southern Section

† – After extra time.

Round of 16

† – After extra time.

Quarter-finals

† – After extra time.

Semi-finals

† – After extra time.

Final

First leg

Second leg

References

See also
 2014–15 Professional U21 Development League
 2014–15 FA Cup
 2014–15 FA Youth Cup
 2014–15 in English football

Premier League Cup (football)
Under-21